Mary Bray may refer to:

 Mary Pipher (born 1947), also known as Mary Bray Pipher, American clinical psychologist and author
 Mary Kay Bray Award, a science fiction award